Claude-Gérard Marcus (24 August 1933 – 24 July 2020) was a French politician.

Biography
Marcus was born in 1933 in the 16th arrondissement of Paris. He was the son of Paul Marcus, a doctor and art dealer. He was able to escape the roundups by Nazi Germany during World War II. In addition to his political career, he chaired the Musée d'Art Juif and helped establish the Musée d'Art et d'Histoire du Judaïsme, of which he was the President until 2001. He subsequently became Honorary President. He also co-chaired the Association Nationale Judaïsme et Liberté.

Claude-Gérard Marcus died on 24 July 2020 at the age of 86.

Distinctions
Officer of the Legion of Honour

Publications
Du sens de l'histoire aux pensées uniques : Quelques vérités d'un ancien député gaulliste (2001)

References

1933 births
2020 deaths
20th-century French politicians
21st-century French politicians
Union of Democrats for the Republic politicians
Rally for the Republic politicians
Politicians from Paris
Members of Parliament for Paris